Augusto may refer to:
 Augusto, an Italian, Portuguese, and Spanish given name or surname
 Augusto (Naples Metro), an underground metro station that serves Line 6 on the Naples Metro
 Augusto (footballer), is a Portuguese professional footballer 
 Augusto (footballer, born 1985), a Brazilian footballer 
 Augusto (footballer, born 1992), a Brazilian footballer
 Augusto (futsal player), a Brazilian born, Azerbaijani futsal player